Enfield Grammar School (abbreviated to EGS; also known as Enfield Grammar) is a boys' Comprehensive school and sixth form with academy status, founded in 1558, situated in Enfield Town in the London Borough of Enfield in North London.

History
Enfield Grammar School was founded on 25 May 1558. The school's first known headmaster was William Bradshawe who was head until 1600.

At its foundation, the school inherited part of a charitable endowment. This property had endowed the earlier Enfield chantry-school which preceded and was incorporated into the Grammar School. As Dr. Birkett Marshall points out, there is evidence a schoolmaster existed in Enfield prior to 1524, based on an account of the funeral of a Sir Thomas Lovell. An older school-house that certainly still existed east of the churchyard in 1572 seems likely to have housed the grammar school established in 1558 until the erection in the 1580s of the Tudor building sometimes referred to as the Old Hall. This was built on the grounds adjacent to Prounces house, bought by the parish in 1516 and originally occupied by John Prouns in 1399. The Tudor school building is still currently in use. There were reportedly boarders in this building for part of its history, as reputedly there were much later at Enfield Court (the Lower School).

On the dissolution of the chantries in 1547 the rights to the charitable property passed to the Crown. However, the Court of Augmentations questioned and challenged the King's title so that in 1550 the property was restored. In 1553 Queen Mary relinquished all claims and in 1558 an attempt was made to endow a school with the Poynetts estate. Unfortunately, a proposed trustee died before the execution of the deed, which meant a second deed granted only £6 13s. 4d. just sufficient for the salary of the former chantry priest who established a school, the remainder being used for the relief of the poor. Thus from 1558, a schoolmaster began teaching the children of Enfield's poor Latin and English 'according to the trade and use of grammar schools'. In 1586 William Garrett left £50 to build a schoolhouse, and this money is presumed to have been used to erect the Tudor building which is still in use and stands adjacent to the west of St. Andrew's Church.

In 1623, when the Prounces estate property was settled in trust, Prounces house became the schoolmaster's residence. One headmaster, Robert Uvedale, while continuing in his post at EGS much to the consternation of the trustees and some parishioners opened another rival private (fee-paying) boarding-school, the Palace School, in about 1660, which survived until 1896.

In 1967, it was amalgamated with Chace Boys School to form a comprehensive school that retained the name Enfield Grammar School. The two schools were separated again in 1970. Chace Boys School has since become co-educational and has changed its name to Chace Community School.

Academic performance
Academic performance at Enfield Grammar School is outstanding, with students entering EGS with very high levels of attainment. Progress and attainment in the Sixth Form are also exceptional. In the Ofsted report from 2014, EGS was rated 'outstanding' in all areas, including Achievement, Behaviour and Safety of pupils; Quality of teaching, learning and assessment; Personal development and Welfare; 16 to 19 study programmes; and Leadership and Management.

As of 2021, the school's most recent inspection by Ofsted was in 2018, with a judgement of Good.

Location
The upper school buildings are next to the Enfield Town Market Place and St. Andrew's Church, and have been extended several times since 1586. A new hall and further extensions were completed shortly before World War II.

Originally Enfield Town where the school is situated was of some historical significance, being near Edward VI's palace where Elizabeth I lived for a while a princess, including during the final illness of Henry VIII. Edward was taken there to join her, so that in the company of his sister Edward Seymour, 1st Earl of Hertford, could break the news to Edward, formally announcing the death of their royal father in the presence chamber at Enfield, on his knees to make formal obeisance to the boy as King. Later Elizabeth held court there when she was queen (this was remembered in the name Palace Gardens that was a street running behind Pearsons department store and is still recalled in the name of Enfield's shopping centre).
In 1924, Enfield Court in Baker Street was purchased to accommodate the lower school. For some years, the first year pupils of the grammar school shared it with the first year pupils of Enfield County School, but it is now used for Enfield Grammar School students in years 7 and 8, and its former gardens provide the school with playing fields. The Enfield Loop of the New River passes through the playing fields, and this is the only stretch of the loop without a public footpath on at least one side of it.

Motto
The school motto, which is incorporated in the school badge is 'Tant Que Je Puis', which is Old French, and means 'As much as I can'. It was taken from the Uvedale family because Dr. Robert Uvedale was master from 1664 to 1676.

Houses
The houses at Enfield Grammar School were originally the basis of a wide range of other competitive internal activities such as drama, debating, competitive sports and so forth.
The school's existing house system is used for some internal sporting activities. The names of the houses are Forty, Myddelton, Poynetts, Raleigh, St. Andrew's and Uvedale.

Admissions
The school has an intake of 180 boys a year. Initial admittance to the school is made via the Local Authority admissions process and is not selective, except that up to 18 pupils (10% of the annual intake) are admitted under Sport & Music Scholarships. These are boys who show that they can contribute at a high level to major school sports or music and would be willing to support the corporate and extra-curricular life of the School. Aptitude tests are held to determine which students can gain entry under this criterion.

There is separate admission into the Sixth Form, which accepts up to 140 students a year. This is based on pupils' GCSE results.

Notable alumni

Derek Austin, librarian; author; developer of innovative digital cataloguing systems
John Morrell Band, (1902–1943), naval officer
Leonard Vivian Biggs, (1873–1944) journalist and politician in Melbourne, Australia
Bob Cobbing, sound, visual, concrete and performance poet
John Coote, (1936-2017) Professor of Physiology at the University of Birmingham
Jim Crace, prize-winning English novelist, a former journalist
Michael Duberry, association football player
Vernon Handley, conductor
Alan Hopes, The Right Reverend, Auxiliary Bishop of Westminster, Roman Catholic bishop.
Jack Howe, architect and industrial designer
Christopher Hughes, quiz champion
David Hutton, footballer
Hugh Jenkins, later Baron Jenkins of Putney, Labour politician, campaigner and member of Parliament and of the House of Lords
Frederic Wood Jones (1879–1954), anatomist, naturalist and anthropologist; see Australian Dictionary of National Biography Online Edition: http://www.adb.online.anu.edu.au/biogs/A090507b.htm
Sir Peter Large, Shell executive until 1962, disabled by polio; subsequently civil servant; disability campaigner; founded Association of Disabled Professionals, parliamentary adviser; appointed MBE 1974, CBE 1987, knighted 1993 for services to disabled people,; 2004 lifetime achievement award from the Royal Association for Disability and Rehabilitation. 16 October 1931 – 13 January 2005, aged 73.
Brian Launder, Professor of Mechanical Engineering
Norman Lewis, author, travel writer
Terry Lightfoot, jazz clarinettist and bandleader 
 Kevin Stewart (footballer) for Hull City.
Jake Livermore, footballer for West Bromwich Albion
Sir Alec Merrison, physicist
Colin Metson, first class cricketer for Middlesex and Glamorgan
Robin Millar,  record producer, musician and businessman
Steve Morison, association football player
Walter Pater, nineteenth-century essayist, critic
Professor Mike Paterson, F.R.S., computer scientist, University of Warwick
Trevor Peacock, actor best known for playing Jim Trott in the BBC comedy series The Vicar of Dibley
John Francis Picard, jazz musician
Oliver G Pike, pioneering wildlife photographer
Ronald Edward Perrin, organist
William Pratt, actor, aka Boris Karloff.
Walter George Ridewood, biologist, anatomist after whom a method of cranial dissection is named (1864–1921) [published five important papers on the cranial osteology of teleostean fishes], son of W. S. Ridewood who was headmaster from 1877 to 1909
Michael J. Smith, cricketer
Mark Tami, politician
Derek Taunt, mathematician and Bletchley Park codebreaker
Professor Philip Tew, professor of literature and novelist
Andrew Turnbull, Baron Turnbull, KCB, CVO, former head of the British Civil Service and Cabinet Secretary; life peer as Baron Turnbull, of Enfield, on 11 October 2005
Frederic Wood Jones, observational naturalist, embryologist, anatomist and anthropologist
 Mason Caton-Brown, Rugby League, Represented England Students and London Broncos. Currently plays for the Salford City Reds
 Tion Wayne, rapper and songwriter
Daniel Phillips, professional footballer for Watford and Trinidad and Tobago national football team
Ryan Mason, former professional footballer and former interim head coach of Premier League club Tottenham Hotspur

Bibliography
A Short History of the Enfield Grammar School by Samuel Smith, 1932;
A Brief History of Enfield Grammar School 1558-1958 by Leslie Birkett Marshall, 1958

See also
 List of schools in Enfield
 London Borough of Enfield
 Grammar schools in the United Kingdom

References

External links
Enfield Grammar School's official website
Enfield Grammar School Old Boys Association
Information about Enfield Grammar in OFSTED
A detailed history of Enfield Grammar School at British History Online
  concerned with the history of private schools in Middlesex: A History of the County of Middlesex: Volume 1; J.S. Cockburn, H.P.F. King, K.G.T. McDonnell (Editors); 1969: 241 - 55.
'Private Education from the Sixteenth Century: Developments from the 16th to the early 19th century', A History of the County of Middlesex: Volume 1: Physique, Archaeology, Domesday, Ecclesiastical Organization, The Jews, Religious Houses, Education of Working Classes to 1870, Private Education from Sixteenth Century (1969), pp. 241–255. URL: http://www.british-history.ac.uk/report.aspx?compid=22124. Date accessed: Friday, 5 October 2007.

External links

Academies in the London Borough of Enfield
Educational institutions established in the 1550s
Boys' schools in London
1558 establishments in England
Secondary schools in the London Borough of Enfield
Enfield, London